Sirajul Islam Mridha is a Bangladesh Nationalist Party politician who was a Member of Parliament for Faridpur-3 from 1979 to 1986.

References

Bangladesh Nationalist Party politicians
Living people
2nd Jatiya Sangsad members
Year of birth missing (living people)